Allocerus is a genus of beetles in the family Cerambycidae, containing the following species:

 Allocerus bicarinatum (Monné & Monné, 1998)
 Allocerus dilaticorne Gory, 1832
 Allocerus spencei (Kirby, 1818)

References

Trachyderini